Swedish Quays at 1–95 Rope Street, London, is a group of flats and houses that is Grade II listed with Historic England. It was built between 1986 and 1990 and designed by David Price and Gordon Cullen.

References

External links 
 

Listed buildings in the London Borough of Southwark